The Phil Wickham discography is about the works of contemporary Christian music and worship musician Phil Wickham.

Albums

Studio albums

Live albums

Christmas albums

Other albums

Singles

As lead artist

As featured artist

Promotional singles

Other charted songs

Other album appearances
This is a list of other album appearances by Phil Wickham on various albums.

Notes

References

Discographies of American artists
Christian music discographies